Dr. Marjatta Aalto (b. 1939) is a Finnish botanist and mycologist known for her work in paleobotany, ethnobotany, and archaeobotany.  She worked at the University of Helsinki's Department of Botany, and she is also known for studying Potamogetonaceae.

Works

References 

 1939 births
 Finnish women scientists
20th-century Finnish botanists
Finnish mycologists
Finnish paleontologists
Finnish archaeologists
Finnish women archaeologists
Living people